The 2004 Maryland Terrapins football team represented the University of Maryland in 2004 NCAA Division I FBS football season. It was the Terrapins' 52nd season as a member of the Atlantic Coast Conference (ACC). Ralph Friedgen led the team for his fourth season as head coach. It was his first as a head coach without a bowl game appearance.

Schedule

2005 NFL Draft
The following players were selected in the 2005 NFL Draft.

References

Maryland
Maryland Terrapins football seasons
Maryland Terrapins football